Joe Guibert Nijimbere (born 26 December 1996) is a Burundian basketball player for Urunani and the Burundi national basketball team.

Early life
Nijimbere was born on 26 December 1996 in Mutanga-Nord, a suburb of Bujumbura, the largest city in the country. He was the second of 9 children. He grew up attending his father's Sunday league basketball games with his three brothers, all of whom ended up playing the sport.

Career
Starting his career for New Star in 2013, he became the youngest player to play at Burundi's highest level at the age of 16. In 2017, Nijimbere signed with IPRC-Kigali in Rwanda.

In 2019, he joined Patriots BBC and was part of the team that qualified for the 2020 BAL season. He was named MVP of the 2019 Genocide Memorial Tournament and won the three-point contest in that year's All-Star game.

In November 2021, Nijimbere returned to New Star to play in the second round of the 2022 BAL Qualifying Tournaments.

In January 2022, Nijimbere Guibert signed a two-year professional contract with Urunani BBC and at the beginning of August 2022 Urunani became the champion of the national basketball league of Burundi: VBL (Viva Basketball League).

On 14 August, Urunani BBC has drawn up a list of 12 players who will represent the club in the BAL Qualifiers with Guibert Nijimbere at the top of the list.

Personal
Nijimbere has studied at the Free University of Kigali.

References

External links
 Guibert Nijimbere at RealGM

1996 births
Living people
Patriots BBC players
IPRC-Kigali basketball players
Point guards
Burundian basketball players
Burundian expatriate sportspeople in Rwanda
Expatriate basketball people
Sportspeople from Bujumbura
New Star BBC players
Urunani BBC players